Natasza Urbańska (born 17 August 1977) is a Polish actress, singer, dancer, and TV presenter.

Filmography

Discography

Albums 
 2008: Balkanika - Balkan Koncept
 2009: Hity Buffo vol. 1 - Natasza Urbanska
 2014: One
 2021: Rajd 44

Singles 
2015: "Hipnotyzuj mnie".
2014: "Escamillo".
2014: "Rolowanie".
2013: "Muszę odejść".
2011: "All The Wrong Places"
2010: "Here I Am"
2010: "Listen To My Radio".
2010: "Love Stone Crazy".
2009: "Mała".
2008: "Już nie zapomnisz mnie".
2008: "Blow over".
2008: "Wierne Róże".
2008: "Rozbaw Mnie".
2007: "I Like It Loud".

Taniec z Gwiazdami
Natasza Urbańska participated in the 10th season of Polish Dancing with the Stars - Taniec z Gwiazdami. She has the highest average score in history of the show - 39.18 out of 40 and the most perfect scores - 11 out of her 17 dances got 40 points.

External links 
 

1977 births
Living people
Polish film actresses
Musicians from Warsaw
Polish stage actresses
Polish female dancers
Polish television presenters
21st-century Polish actresses
Actresses from Warsaw
English-language singers from Poland
21st-century Polish singers
21st-century Polish women singers
Polish pop singers
Polish women television presenters
Masked Singer winners